Tarras Water is a river in Dumfries and Galloway, Scotland.

R.H. Traquair named a fossil of an extinct, prehistoric ray-finned fish Tarrasius problematicus after the Tarras Water. The name has subsequently been applied to the genus Tarrasiidae and the order Tarrasiiformes.

Etymology
The name Tarras is of Brittonic origin. It is derived from the elements *tā-, with a root sense of "melting, thawing, dissolving" (Latin tābeō, "melt") and -ar, an adjectival suffix frequently occurring in river-names (Welsh -ar), with the Scots plural -s.

Course
The Tarras Water rises to the west of Roan Fell, near the boundary with the Scottish Borders. It flows over 11 miles (17 km) south to join the River Esk 2 miles (3 km) south of Langholm opposite Auchenrivock.

Poetry
Tarras Water was a nature poem by Wilfrid Wilson Gibson.

References

1Tarras